Omotolani Daniel Omotola (born 16 April 1998) is a German footballer of African origin who plays for  side Barwell, where he plays as a forward.

Playing career

Tranmere Rovers
Omotola started his career at Tranmere Rovers and was first called up to a matchday squad for their League Two game at Prenton Park against Bury on 2 May 2015, their final match of a 94-year tenure in The Football League. He replaced Rory Donnelly for the final 14 minutes of the 0–1 defeat.

Following that season he spent some time on loan at Burscough and signed his first one-year professional contract on 3 June 2016. Omotola spent the entire 2016–17 season on loan at Witton Albion. He scored 16 goals in all competitions helping Albion to win promotion to the Northern Premier League Premier Division through play-offs. At the end of the season Omotola was not offered a new contract and was released by Tranmere Rovers.

Non-League career
Following his release from Tranmere Rovers, Omotola was snapped up by Northern Premier League Premier Division side Altrincham on 9 June 2017.  He went out on loan twice during his time at Altrincham, the first was to Ramsbottom United, but back with the club in September, 2017. Omotola's second loan was with Loughborough Dynamo at the start of November, 2017, the move turned out to be convenient, as he was a student at Loughborough University.

On 10 July 2018, he signed for Southern League Premier Division Central side Coalville Town, following his release from Altrincham.  Omotola departed Coalville and joined Northern Premier League Premier Division side Buxton on 4 October 2018.  On 21 December 2018, Southern League Division One Central side Corby Town confirmed the signing of Omotola from Buxton. Tolani went on to make six appearances for the club and scored three goals.

On 30 January 2019 Omotola rejoined Coalville Town, returning to the club for his second spell of the season.  He next joined Southern League Premier Division Central side Barwell for the 2019–20 season, initially on non-contract terms. He made his debut on 13 August 2019 in a 2–2 draw away at Alvechurch.  On 31 August 2019, Omatola scored his first goal for the club, scoring a 90th-minute goal in a 3–1 victory over Kings Langley. In the very next Southern League Premier Division Central match on 14 September 2019, he added another two goals to his tally for the season, helping his club to a 3–2 away victory at Needham Market.  Omotola was rewarded with a permanent contract on the 27 September 2019. On 3 December 2019, Omotola scored his first hat trick for Barwell, helping his side to a 5–1 away victory at Stratford Town.

The following season he signed for Hyde United.  At the beginning of August 2021 he joined Alvechurch.  In September 2021 he joined Carlton Town.  He then joined Stafford Rangers in early October 2021 but left the club towards the end of November.  He next joined Atherton Collieries.

Omotola returned to sign for Barwell on 9 August 2022. He made his debut on 13 August 2022 in a Southern League Premier Division Central fixture away to Bedford Town, Tolani came on as an 83rd minute substitute for Roger Lee. The match finished 3–2 to the home side.

Career statistics

Club

Honours

Club

Witton Albion
Northern Premier League Division One South play-offs: 2016–17

References

External links

1998 births
Living people
Association football forwards
German footballers
Black British sportspeople
Tranmere Rovers F.C. players
Burscough F.C. players
Witton Albion F.C. players
Altrincham F.C. players
Ramsbottom United F.C. players
Loughborough Dynamo F.C. players
Coalville Town F.C. players
Buxton F.C. players
Corby Town F.C. players
Barwell F.C. players
English Football League players
Footballers from Mannheim
Atherton Collieries A.F.C. players
Stafford Rangers F.C. players
Carlton Town F.C. players
Alvechurch F.C. players
Hyde United F.C. players